Foch may refer to:

People with the surname Foch
Ferdinand Foch (1851–1929), Marshal of France and Allied Supreme Commander in World War I 
Nina Foch (1924–2008),  Dutch actress

Other uses
French cruiser Foch, a ship (cruiser) of the French Navy, which was launched 1929 and sunk 1942
Foch (R 99), a ship (aircraft carrier) of the French Navy, launched 1960 and sold to Brazil 2000
Avenue Foch, the widest street in Paris
Foch, West Virginia, an unincorporated area in the United States of America
Île Foch, an island in the Kerguelen archipelago
Foch Line, a proposed line of demarcation between Poland and Lithuania after World War I
Marechal Foch (grape), a red wine grape variety
Mount Foch, a mountain on the Continental Divide in Canada
AMX-50 Foch, a long range support variant of the AMX-50 tank